Ames High School is the sole public high school in Ames, Iowa, United States. It is in the Ames Community School District.

Academics

This school is the only public high school in the city of Ames. In August 2019, Ames High School was named the top high school in Iowa by U.S. News & World Report.

Athletics
The Ames Little Cyclones are members of the Iowa Alliance Conference, formerly in the Central Iowa Metro League. Teams sponsored by the school include football, boys and girls cross-country, boys golf, girls swimming, and volleyball in the fall season. During the winter season, the school sponsored sports are boys and girls basketball, wrestling, and boys swimming. The spring consists of girls golf, boys and girls track, boys and girls tennis, and boys and girls soccer. The summer sports are baseball and softball.

The girls' golf team was crowned champions for the State Tournament in 1989, 2009 and 2010.  The boys' golf team are 5-time state champions (1945, 1949, 1968, 1982, 1986).

The Ames High girls' swim team won four state meets in a row from 2010 to 2013, and again in 2015, 2016, and 2017.  The boys' team won the state meet in 1982 and 2018.

The Ames High boys' basketball team has won nine state championships (1936, 1945, 1955, 1973, 1976, 1991, 2009, 2010, 2022) most recently in 2022.

The girls' soccer team won the Class 3A state championship for the first time in 2017.

The Ames High girls' tennis team won the 2A State title four years in a row (2009, 2010, 2011, 2012) and again in 2019. For the first time in school history, the boys' tennis team won the Class 2A state championship in 2011.

Since 1941, Ames High has won 20 state championships in boys' track and field, the most recent in 1991.  The girls' team has won five championships (1987, 1988, 1992, 1995, 1996).  The boys' cross country team have won six state championships (1967, 1968, 1973, 1975, 1983, 1989)

Notable alumni
Harrison Barnes, current NBA player for the Sacramento Kings and 2015 NBA Finals champion.
Robert L. Bartley, editor of The Wall Street Journal editorial page for more than 30 years, winner of Pulitzer Prize and Presidential Medal of Freedom
Steve Dreyer, former MLB player (Texas Rangers)
Jane Espenson, television writer and producer of Buffy the Vampire Slayer
Leslie Hall, rap artist and front-woman of Leslie and the Ly's
Fred Hoiberg, current Nebraska Cornhuskers men's basketball coach and former NBA player and coach
Michelle Hoover, author "Bottomland", "The Quickening"
Stephen Hsu, physics professor, university administrator and tech executive
Dame DeAnne Shirly Julius, current Economist  
Ted Kooser, poet and 13th Poet Laureate of United States, Pulitzer Prize for Poetry (2005)
Edward Mezvinsky, former congressman in United States House of Representatives
Margaret Lloyd, operatic soprano
Doug McDermott, current NBA player for the San Antonio Spurs
Beverley Owen, actress best known for playing the role of Marilyn in The Munsters
Brian Smith, photographer and author of Art & Soul
Nate Staniforth, magician
Neal Stephenson, contributor to Wired and author known for his speculative fiction works

See also
List of high schools in Iowa

References

External links 

 

Buildings and structures in Ames, Iowa
Public high schools in Iowa
Schools in Story County, Iowa
1875 establishments in Iowa
Iowa High School Athletic Association